Diljeet Brar is a Canadian politician, who was elected to the Legislative Assembly of Manitoba in the 2019 Manitoba general election. He represents the electoral district of Burrows as a member of the Manitoba New Democratic Party.

A university professor in India prior to his emigration to Canada, Brar subsequently worked for the provincial government of Manitoba. At the time of his election to the legislature, he was the head of Bulla Arts International, an organization based in Winnipeg which offers educational programs in Punjabi arts and culture.

Election results

References

New Democratic Party of Manitoba MLAs
Canadian Sikhs
Living people
21st-century Canadian politicians
Politicians from Winnipeg
Indian emigrants to Canada
Year of birth missing (living people)